General elections were held in Turkey on 15 October 1961. The electoral system used was party-list proportional representation with the D'Hondt method in 67 electoral districts. In order to receive seats in a district, parties needed to win a Hare quota in that district. The Republican People's Party (CHP) emerged as the largest party, winning 173 of the 450 seats. It was the first time the CHP had won the most seats since the 1946 elections. Voter turnout was 81.4%.

Results

References

General elections in Turkey
Turkey
Turkey
General